Ilkka Maunu Olavi Niiniluoto (born 12 March 1946) is a Finnish philosopher and mathematician, serving as a professor of philosophy at the University of Helsinki since 1981. He is currently on leave from his position, having been appointed as rector of the University of Helsinki on 1 August 2003, for a five-year period. On 25 April 2008 he was chosen to succeed Kari Raivio as chancellor of the University of Helsinki, beginning 1 June 2008.

Work
A significant contribution to the philosophy of science, particularly to the topic of verisimilitude or truth approximation, is his Truthlikeness (Synthese Library, Springer, 1987). Another notable publication is Critical Scientific Realism (Oxford University Press, 2002).

In 1990s, Niiniluoto among other university employees organized a plea to the consistory of the university to abolish ecclesiastic remnants from the university ceremonies.

Ilkka Niiniluoto is editor-in-chief of Acta Philosophica Fennica, the leading philosophical journal of Finland.

From 2008 to 2013, he served as the Chancellor of the University of Helsinki.

In 2011 he gave a Turku Agora Lecture.

Books

References

External links
 helsinki.fi
 Ilkka Niiniluoto in 375 humanists 14.04.2015, Faculty of Arts, University of Helsinki

Analytic philosophers
Finnish philosophers
Finnish mathematicians
Philosophers of science
Atheist philosophers
Finnish skeptics
Academic staff of the University of Helsinki
Foreign Members of the Russian Academy of Sciences
Scientists from Helsinki
1946 births
Living people
Rectors of the University of Helsinki
Chancellors of the University of Helsinki